Natalie Jane Prior is an Australian writer of children's literature and young adult fiction.

Biography
Prior was born in 1963 in Brisbane, Australia, where she also currently lives with her husband and daughter. She is best known for her internationally successful children's fantasy series, Lily Quench, which has been published in more than twenty countries. Her first fiction book, The Amazing Adventures of Amabel, was published in 1990. She is also the author of The Minivers series and many other books including the picture book PomPom, illustrated by long-time collaborator, Cheryl Orsini, and three picture books about The Paw, illustrated by Terry Denton. Her most recent book is The Fairy Dancers, also illustrated by Cheryl Orsini. Prior's work has been a finalist at the Children's Book Council of Australia Awards as well as being honoured and named as notable. Her book, Fireworks and Darkness, won the 2003 Davitt Awards for best young-adult novel and Lily Quench and the Lighthouse of Skellig Mor won the 2003 Aurealis Award for best children's short fiction. She has also been nominated for an Aurealis Award on three other occasions for best short fiction, long fiction and young-adult novel.

Bibliography

Novels
The Amazing Adventures of Amabel (1990)
Amabel Abroad (1992)
Tasha's Witch (1995)
Yesterday's Heroes (1995)
West End Shuffle (1996)
London Calling (1997)
The Loft (1997)
Squish (2002)

Lily Quench

Lily Quench and the Dragon of Ashby (1999)
Lily Quench and the Black Mountains (2001)
Lily Quench and the Treasure of Mote Ely (2002)
Lily Quench and the Lighthouse of Skellig Mor (2003)
Lily Quench and the Magician's Pyramid (2003)
Lily Quench and the Hand of Manuelo (2004, aka The Secret of Manuelo in the UK)
Lily Quench and the Search for King Dragon (2004)
Lily Quench's Companion and Guide to Dragons and the Art of Quenching (2007)

The Ostermark novels
Fireworks and Darkness (2002)
The Star Locket (2006)

The Dolls
Fashion Follies (2005)
Susannah's Notebook (2005)
Horse Fever (2005)
Kiki's Caravan (2006)

The Minivers
Minivers on the Run (2008)
Minivers Fight Back (2009, known as Minivers in Danger in the UK)
Minivers and the Most Secret Room (2010, known as Minivers and the Secret Room in the UK)
Minivers Forever (2011)

Picture books
The Paw (with illustrator Terry Denton)
The Paw (1993)
The Paw in Destination: Brazil (1995)
The Paw in The Purple Diamond (1998)
The Paw Collection (2007, omnibus of the three books with new b/w artwork)

Other books
Minnie Pearl and the Undersea Bazaar (2007; illustrator Cheryl Orsini)
Star (2008; illustrator Anna Pignataro)
Sun (2008; illustrator Anna Pignataro)
PomPom (2012; illustrator Cheryl Orsini)
The Fairy Dancers (2015; illustrator Cheryl Orsini)
Tales of Mrs Mancini (Forthcoming November 2016; illustrator Cheryl Orsini)
"Lucy's Book" (2017; Illustrator Cheryl Orsini)

Non fiction

Bog Bodies, Mummies and Curious Corpses (1994)
Mysterious Ruins, Lost Cities and Buried Treasure (1994)
Dance Crazy: Star Turns from Ballet to Belly Dancing (1995)
Caves, Graves, and Catacombs: Secrets from Beneath the Earth (1996)
The Demidenko Diary (1996)
Cleopatra: Last Queen of Egypt (1998)
Nero: Evil Emperor of Rome (1998)
Chewing Gum: How it Fed the Gods, Went into Space and Helped Win the War (2000)
The Recorder: How it Changed the World, Saved the Universe and Topped the Charts (2000)
Chocolate: How it Saved a Life, Built a City and Conquered the World (2000)
The Encyclopedia of Preserved People: Pickled, Frozen, and Mummified Corpses from Around the World (2002)

Nominations and awards
Aurealis Awards
Best children's long fiction
2002: Nomination: Lily Quench and the Treasure of Mote Ely
Best children's short fiction
2003: Win: Lily Quench and the Lighthouse of Skellig Mor
2003: Nomination: Lily Quench and the Magicians' Pyramid
Best young-adult novel
2002: Nomination: Fireworks and Darkness

Children's Book Council of Australia Awards
Picture Book of the Year
1994: Honour: The Paw
Eve Pownall Award for Information Books
1995: Nominated: Bog Bodies, Mummies and Curious Corpses

Davitt Awards
Best young-adult novel
2003: Won: Fireworks and Darkness

References

External links
Official site

1963 births
Australian children's writers
Living people
Writers from Brisbane
Australian women children's writers